Global Underground 001: Tony De Vit, Tel Aviv is a DJ mix album in the Global Underground series, compiled and mixed by Tony De Vit.  The set was recorded at a gig in the Alenbi 58 club in Tel Aviv, Israel.

In the post acid house clubbing explosion of early 90s Britain, two Newcastle lads with a shared love of dance music literally bumped into each other on a crowded dancefloor. Andy Horsfield and James Todd struck up a friendship and found a way of making a little cash from their passion by selling bootleg tape recordings of live DJ sets to local record shops.

This was a time before the commercial DJ mix CD, when clubbers used to seek out these raw live mixes of their underground heroes on dodgy cassettes with DIY inlay cards. Andy and James convinced their mates running clubs including the Hacienda and Back II Basics to let them record the ‘official’ early tapes of the DJs in this way.

By the mid 90s, big brands like Ministry of Sound and Renaissance had established a growing mainstream market for mix CDs. The boys saw the opportunity and scraped their money together to launch their own label, Boxed. The idea was to stick close to their roots, recording live sets and leaving the DJ alone to make the track selection without compromise. Choosing exotic locations ensured there was a nice foreign adventure involved, and also happened to mirror the increasingly globetrotting schedule of the new breed of superstar DJs perfectly.

They approached Tony de Vit, a DJ unquestionably at the height of his powers in 1996. Tony was at the forefront of pushing the exciting harder house sounds emerging from the UK’s gay underground, focussed around his own weekly residency at legendary London afterhours, Trade.

The mix contains many memorable cuts from that era, from the short looped vocal hooks and tough funky b-lines of disc 1, to the elevating hoover techno on disc 2. As a debut release for Boxed’s Global Underground brand, it had bags of attitude, club savvy and cutting edge sounds. There could have been few better statements that this particular DJ mix series aimed to be something special.

Track listing

Disc one 
E-Motion - "I Stand Alone" (Sharp Vocal Mix) – 5:04
Kitty Lips - "Keep Rockin" – 5:19
Natural Born Grooves - "Forerunner" (Experts Mix) – 5:05
Porn Kings - "Up To No Good" – 4:37
The Expert" - "Take You There" – 6:21
Mangroove - "Get Loose" (Traveller Mix) – 4:58
DJ Supreme - "Tha Wild Style" (Klubheads Hardstyle Mix) – 5:17
Brain Bashers - "Biggest And Badest" – 5:03
Sister Suck - "Gotta Get It Up" (S.Suck Mix) – 5:00
E-Motion - "Naughty North, Sexy South" (Tony De Vit Mix) – 7:58
EJ Doubell - "Axiatonal" (Galaxian Infusion Mix) – 6:47

Disc two 
 Dave Randall - "South" – 5:33
 Antic - "Digital Mass" – 4:49
 Kinky - "Everybody" (De Vit Trade Mix) – 6:58
 Welcome - "Committee" – 4:43
 Bush Babies - "Delicious" (Dave Randall Mix) – 5:37
 Tony De Vit - "Are You All Ready" – 7:55
 Must - "Understood" – 5:09
 Jon the Dentist - "Global Phases" – 5:31
 Format One - "Elevate" – 6:21
 Tony De Vit - "I Don't Care" – 9:04

References

External links 
 
 

Global Underground
1996 live albums
1996 compilation albums
DJ mix albums